Three is the twenty-first studio album by Australian improvised music trio The Necks released in 2020.

Reception

Metacritic, which assigns a normalised rating out of 100 to reviews from mainstream critics, awarded the album a score of 81, based on 8 reviews which is considered as "Universal acclaim".

Pitchfork's Colin Joyce called the album "slow, winding, and meditative" noting it was "composed almost entirely of piano, bass, and drums, and builds outwards from minimal meanderings to overgrown thickets of instrumentation". Thom Jurek on AllMusic stated, "Three offers a nearly dazzling palette of sonic and musical possibility in its gathered and arranged sounds, skillful overdubs, and improvisational acumen, that are performed with unusual directness". In The Quietus Johnny Lamb concluded "It really is outstanding work on all fronts. Each track here has a distinct and complementary topography. Places to explore, spend time in, and marvel at. The Necks remain at the top of their game". JazzTimes reviewer Morgan Enos said "it proves that after tilling the same patch of creative terrain for their entire career, the Necks can still manage a late-period streak of excellence".

Track listing
Composed by Chris Abrahams, Tony Buck and Lloyd Swanton
 "Bloom" – 21:18
 "Lovelock" – 22:48
 "Further" – 21:01

Personnel
Chris Abrahams – piano
Lloyd Swanton – bass
Tony Buck – drums

References

2020 albums
The Necks albums